Ngawi Station (station code: NGW, formerly Paron Station) is a first-class railway station in Gelung, Paron, Ngawi Regency, East Java Province, Indonesia, operated by Kereta Api Indonesia. This railway station located 8–10 km southwest from Ngawi (town). The new building is operated—which has four tracks (two main lines and two passing tracks)—since Geneng–Kedungbanteng double track segment activation on 30 November 2019. Moreover, this former railway station name, Paron, has been changed.

Services

Passenger services

Executive class
 Bangunkarta, destination of  via Solo Jebres– and 
 Gajayana Fakultatif, destination of  via  and

Mixed class

Economy class
 Majapahit, destination of  via  and 
 Jayakarta, destination of  via  and 
 Matarmaja, destination of  via  and 

References

External links 

 Kereta Api Indonesia - Indonesian railway company

Ngawi Regency
Railway stations in East Java